(English: Dutch birds) is a five volume Dutch natural history compendium, published in Amsterdam from 1770. It was published in installments and was finished in 1829. It was the first comprehensive avifauna of the Netherlands (which temporarily included Belgium during 1815 - 1830).

This monumental work was written by Cornelius Nozeman, and after his death by Martinus Houttuyn. The last volume was finished by Jan Sepp, with advice from Coenraad Jacob Temminck. The colored engravings were made by Christiaan Sepp, Jan Christiaan Sepp (his son), and Jan Sepp (his grandson).

Each volume contains 50 images of bird species. Apart from these images, each species is described on a few text pages.

Bibliographic information

Volume 1 
 Amsterdam : J.C. Sepp en zoon, 1770.

(English: Dutch birds; with a description by Cornelius Nozeman, according to their housekeeping, nature and properties. Newly drawn after originals, engraved and naturally coloured, by and under supervision of Christiaan Sepp and son.)

Volume 2, 3, 4 en 5 
 : J.C. Sepp en zoon, 1789 / 1797 / 1809 / 1829.
(English: Dutch birds; with a description by Cornelius Nozeman, according to their housekeeping, nature and properties - and after his death by Martinus Houttuyn. Newly drawn after originals, engraved and naturally coloured, by and under supervision of Christiaan Sepp and son.)

 The makers 
Cornelius Nozeman (1720 - 1786) was a Remonstrant vicar. He wrote the texts of  vol. 1 and a large part of vol. 2. After his death, his work was continued by Martinus Houttuyn (1720 - 1798), who was a physician and biologist. The last volume was put together by the publisher with the help of Coenraad Jacob Temminck (1778 - 1858).

The engravings were made by and under supervision of Christiaan Sepp (c. 1700 - 1775), and later by his son Jan Christiaan Sepp (1739 - 1811) and his grandson Jan Sepp (1778 - 1853).

The works were published by Jan Christiaan Sepp and son. The plates are not signed. It is not always clear who has drawn them.

 Reprint 2014 and digital edition 

The 5 volumes were published in one giant book in the original size of 56 x 39,5 cm.

This reprint has an introduction by Marieke van Delft, Esther van Gelder and Alexander Raat. An index completes this book of suitcase-size with a weight of 11 kg.
The complete set of 250 images on Wikimedia Commons were donated by the KB in 2015.

Footnotes

External links

 Website about the reprint of Nederlandsche vogelen by Lannoo and the Koninklijke Bibliotheek.
 Digital copy at the website of the KB Nederlandsche Vogelen
 Digital copy at the website of Teylers Museum Nederlandsche vogelen.

Ornithological handbooks
Fine illustrated books
Ornithology in the Netherlands
1770 books
Dutch books